Epigaea is a small genus of flowering plant in the family Ericaceae. The flowers are small, white or pink, with a five-lobed tubular corolla which is produced in mid-spring. The fruit is a dry capsule with numerous small seeds.

Extant species
There are three species:

Epigaea repens is listed as an endangered species in some U.S. states.

Symbolism
The name Mayflower was in tradition given to E. repens by the Pilgrim Fathers after their ship the Mayflower; the plant was abundant where the ship landed at Plymouth Rock, Massachusetts. For this reason, it was chosen to be the state flower of Massachusetts. It is also the provincial flower of Nova Scotia. The name Trailing Arbutus reflects its similarity to the trees in the related genus Arbutus, while being much smaller and prostrate on the ground.

Cultivation and uses
All three species are grown as ornamental plants in rockeries, where they require moist, acidic soil. A hybrid between E. repens and E. asiatica, Epigaea × intertexta has also been developed for garden planting.

References

 
Ericaceae genera
Taxa named by Carl Linnaeus